Linea Johnson (born 1985 or 1986) is the American co-author of the 2012 memoir Perfect Chaos and a mental health advocate.

Early life and education 
Linea Johnson grew up in Chelan, Washington with her sister Jordan and mental health professional mother and father, Cinda and Curt. While Johnson was in middle school, her family moved to Bellevue, Washington. She graduated from Sammamish High School, where she and her mother say was a high achiever. Johnson played fastpitch softball and basketball throughout school, and played piano and took voice lessons for choir. Johnson was diagnosed with depression after her first "crash" during high school, after she quit her activities, and prescribed antidepressants. She said that the medication helped with the sadness, but also "robbed [her] of the euphoria of joy", so she stopped taking them.

After graduating, Johnson moved to Chicago, Illinois to attend Columbia College majoring in music performance on a scholarship. Halfway through her freshman year, Johnson had another major depressive episode, prompting her to seek counseling. She was diagnosed with bipolar disorder, which she and her mother did not believe as Johnson did not experience mania, and Johnson turned to alcohol and marijuana to deal with her depression and anxiety instead. After a trip to Scotland and England, and a summer internship, Johnson experienced another depressive episode during her sophomore year of college, prompting her to seek out a psychiatrist, who diagnosed her with bipolar II disorder, explaining that it was different than bipolar I disorder, accompanied only by hypomania and severe depressive mood swings Johnson was familiar with. He prescribed her hypnotics, which Johnson said she never filled because she was constantly obsessing over suicide. Johnson subsequently dropped out of Columbia and moved back to Washington with her parents to seek treatment.

Johnson's mother said that because she and Johnson's father were well connected in Seattle's mental health professional community it only took a couple of weeks to set Johnson up with treatment, but recognized the "mental-health maze" was inaccessible and inequitable for most patients. After starting treatment, Johnson moved into her own apartment in Capitol Hill, a neighborhood in Seattle. Soon after, she experienced another episode and planned a suicide attempt. She alerted her doctor and was transported to Harborview Medical Center and transferred to the University of Washington Medical Center's psychiatric unit where she underwent electroconvulsive therapy, a treatment that induces seizures, and an intense six-week treatment cycle that ultimately relieved her of her suicidal thoughts.

Following her treatment, Johnson enrolled in Seattle University where she received a Bachelor of Arts in creative writing.

Johnson also holds a Master's degree in Healthcare Leadership from Brown University.

Career 
Johnson started her career as an intern at the Seattle Center Foundation and later as an intern at World Health Organization working on mental health policy. 

After graduating from college, she joined Harborview Medical Center. 

She joined the University of Washington in 2015, where she is now the communications manager of the ADA National Network Knowledge Translation Center.

Johnson delivers talks and volunteers in the mental health community and advocates for better mental healthcare in the United States.

Selected works

External links 

 
 Profile at University of Washington

References 

1980s births
Living people
21st-century American women writers
21st-century American writers
Activists from Seattle
Brown University alumni
Columbia College Chicago alumni
Mental health activists
People from Bellevue, Washington
People from Chelan, Washington
People from Seattle
People with bipolar disorder
Seattle University alumni
University of Washington faculty
Writers from Seattle
Writers from Washington (state)
Year of birth missing (living people)